George Isaac Huntingford (1748–1832) was successively of Bishop of Gloucester and Bishop of Hereford.

Life
Huntingford was educated at Winchester College and New College, Oxford, where he became a Fellow in 1770, graduating M.A., 1776 and D.D. in 1793. He was then curate of Compton, south of Winchester, before becoming a master of his old school, of which he was warden from 1780 until his death. During this time there was considerable disorder in the school, including two rebellions.

In 1789 he was elected Warden of Winchester College.

Through his friendship with Henry Addington, who he had taught at Winchester, Huntingford became Bishop of Gloucester, 1802–1815, and of Hereford, 1815–32, but continued to live in the comfortable Warden's lodgings at the school.

He compiled an account of his friend Henry Addington's administration, 1802; published also Short Introduction to Writing of Greek (frequently reissued), original Latin and Greek verse, and pamphlets.

From 1789 until 1825 he was vicar of the Church of St John the Evangelist, Milborne Port.

References

Further reading

 Bell, A., "Warden Huntingford and the Old Conservatism", Winchester College: Sixth Centenary Essays (ed. Custance), Oxford 1982

1748 births
1832 deaths
People educated at Winchester College
Alumni of New College, Oxford
Fellows of New College, Oxford
Bishops of Gloucester
Bishops of Hereford
Fellows of the Royal Society
Wardens of Winchester College